A Dragon Arrives! is a 2016 Iranian period mystery supernatural thriller film directed by Mani Haghighi. It was selected to compete for the Golden Bear at the 66th Berlin International Film Festival.

Cast
 Amir Jadidi
 Homayoun Ghanizadeh
 Ehsan Goudarzi
 Kiana Tajammol
 Nader Fallah
Sadegh Zibakalam
Mani Haghighi

References

External links
 

2016 films
2010s historical films
2010s thriller films
2010s supernatural thriller films
2010s mystery films
Iranian historical films
Supernatural thriller films
Films set in the 1960s
Historical mystery films
Films directed by Mani Haghighi